Symbrenthia lilaea, the peninsular jester, is a species of nymphalid butterfly found in South Asia and Southeast Asia. It forms a superspecies with Symbrenthia hippoclus. There are numerous regional forms, and the taxonomy of the group is not well resolved.

Description

Wet-season form, male. Upperside black, with orange-yellow markings as follows:

Forewing: discoidal streak clavate, bi-indentate above; a contiguous spot at base of interspace 3; a short, outwardly oblique band from middle of dorsum contracted in the middle; another outwardly oblique, somewhat macular, short, broad, preapical band from beyond middle of costa to interspace 4, with two small spots above it in interspaces 5 and 6.

Hindwing: a very broad sub-basal transverse band narrow at the costal margin, a postdiscal narrower similar band contracted into a line towards costal margin, sometimes traversed by a line of black spots and a subterminal very slender line.

Underside, ochraceous orange with numerous spots and lines of ferruginous, that form on forewing a short, outwardly oblique streak not extending beyond interspaced, and on hindwing a sub-basal transverse streak in continual ion of the above streak on the forewing; also on both wind's a series of obscure postdiscal cone-shaped marks, irrorated and rendered indistinct on the hindwing by a large patch of pink scales turning to a bluish lunule in interspace 3; forewing with a ferruginous, hindwing with a pale yellow subterminal line.

Antennae black, ochraceous at apex; head with ferruginous pubescence; thorax and abdomen black on upperside, ochraceous beneath.

Female: Similar, the orange markings broader and somewhat paler on the upperside.

Dry-season form differs in both sexes as follows: The orange markings on the upperside broader and paler in the middle, the short bands oil the anterior and posterior portions of the wing coalescing. Underside paler, all the dark markings less clearly defined than in the wet-season form.

Distribution
The Himalayas from Hazara division Pakistan to Sikkim; Assam; Burma; Tenasserim, extending to the Malayan subregion.

Life history

Larva
Body cylindrical. Head black, flattened in front, vortex broad and sharply depressed in the middle, minutely hairy, cheeks slightly tuberculous; third to the last segment armed with a dorsal and four lateral rows of black, rigid, branched spines on each side; segments fuliginous black, second segment with a slender pale ochreous dorsal line, third to last segment with two sublateral rows of small pale ochreous spots.

Pupa
Pale purpurescent ochreous; thorax and abdomen laterally protuberant in front; with a thoracic and anterior-dorsal pointed prominence; abdominal segment with a row of dorsal and lateral small points; head-piece projecting and widely cleft. (Moore.)

Gallery

See also
List of butterflies of India (Nymphalidae)

References

Nymphalini
Butterflies of Asia
Butterflies described in 1864
Butterflies of Singapore
Taxa named by William Chapman Hewitson